Guruntum is a Chadic language spoken in Bauchi and Alkaleri LGAs, Bauchi State, Nigeria. In 1993 it was spoken by about 15,000 people.

Classification
Guruntum is a West Chadic language of the Barawa (B.3) group.

Major dialects include Kuuku, Gayar, Mbaaru, Dooka, Gar and Karakara.

Phonology

Vowels
In addition, two nasalized vowel phonemes exist:  .
  

Consonants

 is realized as a flap intervocalically before back vowels; elsewhere it is a trill.

Tone
Guruntum has four tones: high, low, rising (low-high) and falling (high-low).

References

West Chadic languages
Languages of Nigeria